ACNA may refer to:

 Anglican Church in North America
 ACNA (company)